Teemu Harju is a Finnish professional darts player who currently plays in World Darts Championship (WDF) events. He won a silver medal at the WDF Europe Cup and represented Finland during the WDF World Cup and WDF Europe Cup.

Career
Harju was a prospective Finnish player. He took part in the PDC World Youth Championship three times as a qualifier from Scandinavia. His best result was at the 2012 PDC World Youth Championship, where he defeated Ryan Harrington in the first round match by 5–1 in legs. In the second round he lost to Rhys Dudley by 3–5 in legs.

At the end of September 2022, he was selected by the national federation to participate in the 2022 WDF Europe Cup. On the third day of the tournament, he advanced to the finals of the singles competition, defeating Nick Kenny, Jan McIntosh and Danny van Trijp on the road to the final. In the final, he lost to Jacques Labre by 2–7 in legs and becoming the first singles medalist from Finland since Ulf Ceder in 2012. In the team competition, advanced with his team to the quarter-finals, where they lost to the team from Netherlands. In the pair competition, he was eliminated in the first phase.

Performance timeline

References

Living people
Finnish darts players
Year of birth missing (living people)